Ruan Lingyu (born Ruan Fenggen; April 26, 1910 – March 8, 1935), also known by her English name Lily Yuen, was a Chinese silent film actress. One of the most prominent Chinese film stars of the 1930s, her exceptional acting ability and suicide at the age of 24 led her to become an icon of Chinese cinema.

Early life 
Ruan was born to a working class family in Shanghai, and her ancestral home is in Xiangshan, Guangdong. Her father died when she was young, and her mother brought her up working as a housemaid.

Career

Early career

In 1926, to help make ends meet, Ruan signed up for the prominent Mingxing Film Company. She made her first film at the age of 16. The film, A Married Couple in Name Only (掛名的夫妻/挂名的夫妻), was directed by Bu Wancang. 

Two years later, she was signed by Da Zhonghua Baihe Company (大中華百合公司/大中华百合公司), where she shot six films. Her first big break came in Spring Dream of an Old Capital ( or Reminiscences of Beijing, 1930), which was a massive hit in China. It was Ruan's first major work after signing with the newly formed Lianhua Studio in 1930. In it, she played a prostitute by the name of Yanyan.

Breakthrough and important films
Thereafter, Ruan became Lianhua's major film star. Her most memorable works came after 1931, starting with the melodrama Love and Duty (directed by Bu Wancang). Ruan had by then gained popularity owing to a string of leading roles, and in 1933 she was voted second runner-up in a poll held by Star Daily (明星日報) for China's "movie queen". (Hu Die emerged the winner and Chen Yumei was first runner-up). Beginning with Three Modern Women (1932), Ruan started collaborating with a group of leftist Chinese directors.

In Little Toys (1933), a film by Sun Yu, Ruan played a long-suffering toy-maker. Her next film, The Goddess (1934; dir: Wu Yonggang), is often hailed as the pinnacle of Chinese silent cinema; Ruan sympathetically portrayed a prostitute bringing up a child. Later that year, Ruan made her penultimate film, New Women (directed by Cai Chusheng), in which she played an educated woman forced to death by an unfeeling society. The film was based on the life of actress Ai Xia, who killed herself in 1934. Her final film, National Customs, was released shortly after her death.

One of Ruan's earliest films, Love and Duty (1931), directed by Bu Wancang and long believed to be a lost film, was discovered in Uruguay in 1994.

Personal life

At the age of 16, Ruan became acquainted with Zhang Damin (张达民/張達民), whose family her mother worked for. Zhang was later driven out of his wealthy family due to his spendthrift ways and became a chronic gambler, supported by Ruan's salary. Unable to tolerate Zhang's gambling, Ruan split with him in 1933. 

She then began living with Tang Jishan, a tea tycoon. In 1935, Zhang filed a lawsuit asking for reparations from Ruan. The tabloids seized on this opportunity to probe into Ruan's private life and put her under intense pressure.

Following the completion of New Women, Ruan's life began to unravel. The film opened in Shanghai in 1935. Cai Chusheng was under massive pressure from tabloid reporters, who were extremely hostile, owing to the scathing depiction of the Shanghai tabloids in the movie. Cai was forced to make extensive cuts to the film. Even after that, Ruan's private life was mercilessly seized upon by the tabloids and her lawsuit with her first husband, Zhang Damin, became a source of vindictive coverage.

Death
Faced with her various public issues and intense private problems, Ruan committed suicide in Shanghai on March 8, 1935, at the age of 24, by taking an overdose of barbiturates. Her suicide note apparently contained a line which says "gossip is a fearful thing" (人言可畏), although recent researchers have doubted the note's authenticity as it appears to have been forged by Tang Jishan. Even China's preeminent intellectual Lu Xun was appalled at the details surrounding Ruan's death and wrote an essay entitled "Gossip is a Fearful Thing", denouncing the tabloids.

Recent researchers believe her deteriorating relationship with Tang Jishan and Zhang Damin's lawsuit were the cause of Ruan's death. It was further intensified by the mob media of China after New Women was released, since the film depicted the life of actress Ai Xia, who committed suicide due to media rumors about her private life. Ruan is also believed to have been physically abused on the evening that she died.

Funeral services and subsequent tributes

Her funeral service at the Wanguo Funeral Home lasted for three days. Several well-known film actors and actress attended her funeral, including Wang Renmei, Lin Chuchu and Liang Saizhen, and her pallbearers included some of the leading film directors such as Lai Man-Wai, Fei Mu, Wu Yonggang and Cai Chusheng. After the service, Ruan's casket was taken to a cemetery in Zhabei district.

The New York Times called it "the most spectacular funeral of the century".

Ruan Lingyu's tomb was destroyed during the Cultural Revolution. In 1998, a uniquely designed monument dedicated to her debuted in Fushouyuan Cemetery in Shanghai.

Suicide notes and alleged forgery
Two sets of suicide notes existed that were purportedly written by Ruan Lingyu just before her death.

First version

The earlier suicide notes were first published in Lianhua Pictorial (聯華畫報) on April 1, 1935, in a commemorative issue on Ruan Lingyu's death, supplied by Tang Jishan with whom Ruan Lingyu was cohabiting at the time of her death.

These suicide notes are now believed to have been forged by Tang Jishan, as Ruan Lingyu was unlikely to have written a letter to the press over her suicide, furthermore with lines like "[my spirit] will watch over you forever and ever" to Tang Jishan, a notorious womanizer.

Second version

On April 26, 1935, the Siming Journal of Business (《思明商學報》) published what are now believed to be the real suicide notes of Ruan Lingyu. As the Siming Journal was a journal with an internal circulation of just 1,500 copies, few in China read about this and the article was largely forgotten after its initial publication.

The editor of Siming Journal claimed that Tang Jishan got Liang Saishan (梁賽珊), the sister of his lover Liang Saizhen (梁賽珍), to forge Ruan Lingyu's handwriting and suicide notes, which were then published in Lianhua Pictorial. Pricked by their conscience, Liang Saishan and Liang Saizhen later supplied Siming Journal with Ruan Lingyu's real suicide notes.

The notes were allegedly carelessly written, with many characters stricken off and rewritten, reflecting Ruan Lingyu’s state of mind. Most researchers believe them to be the authentic suicide notes left behind by Ruan.

The suicide notes were republished by Professor Lian Wenguang (连文光) in his 1993 book, Chinese and International Cinemas: History and Anecdotes. Public interest reignited after Shanghai's Xinmin Evening News reported the research of film historian Shen Ji (沈寂) in 2001, which coincided with Lian Wenguang’s findings.

Suicide note 1:

Suicide note 2:

Portrayal in popular culture

Films
Zhang Damin, who tried to tell his story regarding Ruan's suicide (and profit financially), agreed in 1935 to star as himself in a film titled Tears of Love (情淚). The film was aborted following angry backlash. Zhang did not give up, however. In 1937, a Hong Kong film titled Who's to Blame? (誰之過) directed by Shum Kat-sing (沈吉誠) appeared, starring Zhang as himself and Tam Yuk Lan (譚玉蘭) as Ruan; this may have been the same film as Tears of Love. In 1938, Zhang starred in yet another Hong Kong film, Wife of a Friend (朋友之妻), written and directed by Mak Tai-fung (麥大豐). This film did not invoke Ruan's name, but the reference cannot be more obvious: according to a handbill, the film told about an immoral womanizer who abandons his own wife to seduce his friend's, with the friend's wife committing suicide in the end. Neither film appears to have survived, and Zhang died from an illness later in 1938 in Hong Kong, apparently penniless.

In 1991, Hong Kong director Stanley Kwan made a movie about her life, Center Stage, starring Maggie Cheung as Ruan  Lingyu. Cheung won the Berlin Film Festival Silver Bear for Best Actress. Zhang Damin and Tang Jishan are portrayed by Lawrence Ng and Chin Han respectively. The film is credited to have revived public interest in Ruan Lingyu and her films.

TV series
In 1985, Cecilia Wong (黃杏秀) played Ruan in a 20-episode TV series aired on Asia Television, titled Ruan Lingyu/The Stardust Memories.

In 2005, Jacklyn Wu Chien-lien played Ruan in a 30-episode Chinese TV series, also titled Ruan Lingyu.

Kong Lingjie (孔令洁) played Ruan Lingyu in the 1996 Chinese TV series Movie Queen Butterfly (影后胡蝶).

Ruan Lingyu's name was discussed throughout the HK TVB series - The 'W' Files (衛斯理) in 2003; however, there was no character portrayal. It was fitting to mention her name in the series since the plot was set in Shanghai during the 1930s, and she was a notable figure during that time.

Filmography

See also 
 Cinema of China
 Jin Yan
 Zhou Xuan

References

Bibliography

External links

 Chinese Film Classics: Ruan Lingyu (chinesefilmclassics.org): scholarly website with English-subtitled versions of Ruan's films Love and Duty (1931), The Peach Girl, Playthings (aka Little Toys), Goddess (plus two video lectures), and New Women (plus two video lectures), and related material about Ruan, hosted by the University of British Columbia
 Love and Duty (1931) with English subtitles (Chinese Film Classics website)
 The Peach Girl (1931) with English subtitles (Chinese Film Classics website)
Playthings (1933) with English subtitles (Chinese Film Classics website) 
Goddess (1934) with English subtitles (Chinese Film Classics website)
New Women (1935) with English subtitles (Chinese Film Classics website)

 Ruan Lingyu at the dianying.com
 Ruan Lingyu, Queen in Silent Film Period
  The Beauty Of Shanghai – Ruan Ling Yu: The Chinese Greta Garbo (Biography)

1910 births
1935 suicides
Chinese film actresses
Chinese silent film actresses
Drug-related suicides in China
Suicides in the Republic of China
20th-century Chinese actresses
Actresses from Shanghai
Burials in Shanghai
People of Cantonese descent
1935 deaths